Pam or PAM may refer to:

Geography 
 Pam, Iran, a village in Markazi Province
 Piedmont Atlantic Megaregion, or PAM, United States
 Tyndall Air Force Base, Panama City, Florida, US (IATA code PAM)

People and fictional characters with the name
 Pam (given name), a list of people and fictional characters
 Pam (surname), a list of people
 Henry John Temple, 3rd Viscount Palmerston (1784–1865), nicknamed Pam

Arts, entertainment, and media
 Pam, a name for the jack of clubs in the card game Lanterloo or Loo
 Pam (song), a song by Justin Quiles, Daddy Yankee and El Alfa
 Performing Arts Museum, former name of the Australian Performing Arts Collection in Melbourne, Australia 
 Perpetual art machine, a video art project
 Progressive Art Movement (Australia), a 1970s art movement in Adelaide, South Australia

Enterprises and organizations
 Agrarian Party of Moldova, or 
 Authenticity and Modernity Party, or Parti Authenticité et Modernité, a political party in Morocco
 PAM Transport, a trucking company in Arkansas
 Party of the Vlachs of Macedonia, known in Aromanian as 
 People's Action Movement, a political party in Saint Kitts and Nevis
 Pharmaceutical Association of Mauritius
 Pittsburgh, Allegheny and McKees Rocks Railroad, reporting mark PAM
 Portland Art Museum, in Portland, Oregon
 Service Union United, a trade union in Finland
 World Food Programme, also known as Programme alimentaire mondial

Military 
 P.A.M. 1 & P.A.M. 2, Argentine submachine gun based on the U.S. M3 "Grease Gun"
 Permanent Active Militia (Canada)
 Policy Analysis Market, an abandoned DARPA program
 Precision Attack Munition, an abandoned artillery missile project

Science and technology

Biology and healthcare
 PAM (gene), human gene that encodes peptidylglycine alpha-amidating monooxygenase
 Pancreatic acinar metaplasia, in gastroenterology
 Photoacoustic microscopy, a type of photoacoustic imaging in biomedicine
 Pneumatic artificial muscles, used in artificial limbs
 Point accepted mutation, a type of similarity matrix in computational biology
 Positive allosteric modulator, in pharmacology
 Pralidoxime, 2-PAM, or pyridine aldoximine methiodide; an acetylcholinesterase inhibitor
 Pregnancy-associated malaria
 Primary amoebic meningoencephalitis
 Protospacer adjacent motif, a genetic DNA recognition sequence

Computing 
 PAM graphics format, used by Netpbm
 PAM library, Parallel Augmented Map, a parallel library for ordered sets and maps using balanced binary trees
 Pluggable authentication modules (also known as X/Open Single Sign-on), a Unix authentication framework
 OpenPAM
 Linux PAM

Other uses in science and technology 
 Partitioning Around Medoids, in statistics, a data clustering algorithm
 Payload Assist Module, a small rocket engine, also referred to as a PAM-D
 Phone-as-Modem, sharing a phone's internet connection with other devices
 Polyacrylamide, a polymer
 Positive electrode Active Material, surface layer of the positive electrode of a rechargeable battery
 Pulse-amplitude modulation, a technique for encoding information onto a series of signal pulses

Other uses 
 PAM (cooking oil), a brand of cooking spray, acronym of "Product of Arthur Meyerhoff"
 Cyclone Pam (1997)
 Cyclone Pam, a tropical cyclone from the 2014–15 South Pacific cyclone season
 Kapampangan language (ISO 639-2 and ISO 639-3 code pam)
 Pam language, a nearly extinct language of northern Cameroon

See also